The Rana Wickrama Padakkama (RWP, Combat Gallantry Medal) (Sinhala: රණ වික්‍රම පදක්කම) is awarded to Sri Lankan military service personnel serving in both the regular- and volunteer forces as a reward for: 

Bars could be awarded for further acts of gallantry meriting the award for a second and third time, denoted by a star in the ribbon bar for each additional award. The award is the only one to have been awarded to a military animal in Sri Lanka.

Award process
A formal recommendation is made by service commanders, and the decoration is awarded by the President following a review process. Recipients are eligible to the use of the post-nominal letters "RWP".

Notable decorated personnel
Field Marshal Sarath Fonseka
Air Chief Marshal Roshan Goonatilake
Air Chief Marshal Jayalath Weerakkody
Lieutenant General Denzil Kobbekaduwa 
Vice Admiral Travis Sinniah
Major general Ananda Hamangoda 
Major general Sarath Munasinghe
Major general Janaka Perera 
Major general Wasantha Perera
Major general Nandana Senadeera
Major general Lucky Wijayaratne 
Major general Vijaya Wimalaratne 
Major General Laksiri Waduge 
Rear Admiral Sarath Dissanayake
Air Vice Marshal Harsha Abeywickrama
Air Vice Marshal P.B. Premachandra
Brigadier Udene Kendaragama
Air Commodore Shirantha Goonatilake 
Colonel A. F. Lafir  
Colonel Tuan Nizam Muthaliff 
Colonel Prasanna Wickramasuriya
Lieutenant Colonel Lalith Jayasinghe  
Lieutenant Colonel Gotabhaya Rajapaksa
Wing Commander Thilina Chandima Kaluarachchi
Lieutenant Commander S.W. Gallage
Squadron Leader Dihan Fernando
Squadron Leader Amal Wahid
 Flying Officer Chinthaka Hettiarachchi
'Commando' Snowy
Major general S A D A D Gunawardena

References

 Army, Sri Lanka. (1st Edition - October 1999). "50 YEARS ON" - 1949-1999, Sri Lanka Army.

External links
Sri Lanka Army
Sri Lanka Navy
Sri Lanka Air Force
Ministry of Defence : Sri Lanka

Military awards and decorations of Sri Lanka
Courage awards
Awards established in 1981